Banganga Tank is an ancient water tank at Walkeshwar Temple Complex in Malabar Hill area of Mumbai City

Banganga may also refer to:

Rivers in India
 Banganga River (Jammu and Kashmir), a river that flows through Katra, Jammu and Kashmir
 Banganga River (Rajasthan), a river in Rajasthan, known for the annual Banganga Fair
 Banganga River (Maharashtra), a river in Maharashtra, that flows through the Nashik district
 Banganga River, a small rivulet, at the foothills of shrine Vaishno Devi
 Banganga River, a river in Himachal Pradesh that flows near Kangra

Other uses
 Banganga, Nepal, a municipality in Kapilvastu District, Nepal